Holbeck Rugby Club, also known as the Holbeck Imps, was a semi-professional rugby league club based in Leeds, West Riding of Yorkshire, England. The club were the original owners of Elland Road football stadium, now the home of Leeds United.

History 

The exact date Holbeck were formed is unknown, but they joined the Northern Union in time for its second season in 1896–97. They played for eight seasons, from 1896–97 to 1903–04. As semi-professionals, Holbeck played at the Recreation Ground on Elland Road.

The city of Leeds had an abundance of rugby football clubs and although members of the Yorkshire RFU, which was in turn part of the RFU, it was decided to form a more local association.  It was for this reason that the Leeds & District organization was formalised when a meeting took place at the Green Dragon Hotel, Leeds, on 27 September 1888. The founding clubs were Bramley, Holbeck, Hunslet, Kirkstall, Leeds Parish Church, Leeds St John’s and Wortley.

In the 1896–97 season, the league was divided into Yorkshire and Lancashire Senior Competitions, Holbeck entering the former. They finished 15th (second bottom) with 18 points from 30 games. In 1897, when the lease was not renewed on Holbeck Recreation Ground, they bought the Old Peacock Ground from Bentley's Brewery for £1,100, with a stipulation that it remained a football ground for at least seven years, and that all the catering rights should be held for that period by the brewery. The site of the Old Peacock Ground, an open grass field, was at the foot of Beeston Hill on the Leeds to Elland Road. The land was known locally as the Old Peacock Ground due to the close proximity to the pub of the same name which it faced.

The club erected a new stand in the close season in readiness for the forthcoming 1898–99 season. The ground eventually became known simply as Elland Road.

Over the next four seasons Holbeck struggled, finishing 14th in 1897–98, 13th in 1898–99, 13th in 1899–1900 and 14th again in 1900–01, in each case out of 16 clubs.

At the end of this season the top seven clubs in both the Lancashire Senior Competition and the Yorkshire Senior Competition (which included Hunslet) split and formed the "new" Rugby League. The remaining clubs, with several new additions continued in the Lancashire and Yorkshire Senior Competitions, which became in effect two regional second divisions.

Only limited County League information is available for (1901–02). Holbeck finished in fifth position, but unfortunately for them there was no promotion and relegation. At the end of this season, several more clubs withdrew and the league was again re-organised into two divisions of 16 clubs.

In 1902–03, Holbeck again finished 5th out of the 16 clubs. For the 1902–03 season football team Leeds Woodville ground shared as tenants of Holbeck Rugby Club.

In 1903–04, in what was to be Holbeck’s last season, Wakefield Trinity were champions with 55 points from 32 games, with St Helens and Holbeck in joint second place, both on 39 points. A promotion play-off took place on a neutral ground on Saturday 14 May 1904 and St. Helens were promoted after beating Holbeck 7–0. As a result, the club decided that it would be financially unable to continue in the second division and folded.

Successor clubs 

At a meeting at the Griffin Hotel in Boar Lane in August 1904, a new Association football club, Leeds City Association Football Club, was formed and it was agreed that the Elland Road ground would be rented for the upcoming season. It has been suggested that Holbeck Rugby Club reformed as Leeds City but there does not appear to be any hard evidence to support this claim.

Leeds City were expelled from the Football League in 1919 but Leeds United took their place five years later and have played at Elland Road ever since.

Club colours 

Several articles suggest that Holbeck RFC played in blue and yellow (or gold), which are the sporting colours of Leeds.

Internationals to have played for Holbeck 

 Tom Pook (b 1869 d 21 February 1948) was a "small" (only 5’6" tall) forward who played rugby union for Newport and Wales before turning semi-professional with Holbeck, making his Holbeck debut on 3 September 1898.

Club records

Club scoring record

Club league record  

Heading Abbreviations
Pl = Games played;  W = Win; D = Draw; L = Lose; PF = Points for; PA = Points against; Diff = Points difference (+ or -); Pts = League Points 
League points: for win = 2; for draw = 1; for loss = 0.

Several fixtures and results 
The following are a selection of Holbeck's fixtures from the eight seasons in which they played semi-professional rugby league :- 
 
  

Competition Abbreviations
YSC = Yorkshire Senior Competition;  D2 = 2nd Division
D2 PO = 2nd Division Promotion Play-Off
CC R2 = Challenge Cup, round 2

1 – Holbeck Rec = Holbeck Recreation Ground. 
2 – Old Peacock = Old Peacock Ground before it became established.

Notable players
Jacky Braithwaite
Tom Pook
Kelly of Holbeck played, and G. Hainsworth of Holbeck played, and scored a goal in The Rest's 5-7 defeat by Leeds in the 1901–02 Yorkshire Senior Competition Champions versus The Rest match at Headingley Stadium on Saturday 19 April 1902.

See also 

Elland Road
Leeds City F.C.
List of defunct rugby league clubs

References

External links 
RL All time records 
A history of Elland Road Stadium 
Elland Road (Football and Greyhound Stadia) from the air

Defunct rugby league teams in England
Sport in Leeds
Rugby league teams in West Yorkshire